Jack Ingram (born 1970) is an American country musician.

Jack Ingram may also refer to:
Jack Ingram (album), the debut album by country music artist Jack Ingram
Jack Ingram (racing driver) (1936–2021), NASCAR driver
Jack Ingram (actor) (1902–1969), American film actor
Jack Ingram (ice hockey) (1893–1957), ice hockey player

See also
John Ingram (disambiguation)

Ingram, Jack